Harold Kandel (May 30, 1906 – 1994) was a legendary theatregoer from Toronto, Ontario, Canada, known for speaking out during theatre events, contrary to the standard social conventions of western adult theatre.

Notably, he was barred from the Stratford Festival for just this social violation. The legend of Harold has grown to be honored by performers across Canada, in the year of his death, theatrical awards in the city of Toronto, and a Fringe theater festival review magazine adopted his name. He was issued complimentary seats to all shows performed by Mump and Smoot.

The Harold Awards are now presented each spring in an informal atmosphere and the nominees are unaware that they are in the running for the award.

In 1995, the Harold Awards published this description of its namesake - theatregoer and frequent heckler Harold Kandel.

References

1906 births
1994 deaths
People from Toronto